Arms and the Man or Heroes is a 1958 West German historical comedy film directed by Franz Peter Wirth and based on the 1894 play of the same name by George Bernard Shaw. It was nominated for the Academy Award for Best Foreign Language Film. It was also entered into the 1959 Cannes Film Festival.

The film's sets were designed by the art director Hermann Warm. It was shot at the Bavaria Studios in Munich.

Plot
1865: Swiss captain Bluntschli fights as mercenary in the war between Bulgaria and Serbia. When his group's attacked by a few Bulgarian troopers, he learns that he's got the wrong ammunition for his cannon and has to flee. His flight leads him right into the bedroom of his enemy's fiancée.

Cast

See also
 List of submissions to the 31st Academy Awards for Best Foreign Language Film
 List of German submissions for the Academy Award for Best Foreign Language Film

References

External links

1958 romantic comedy films
German romantic comedy films
West German films
German films based on plays
Films based on works by George Bernard Shaw
Films directed by Franz Peter Wirth
Films set in the 1880s
Films set in Bulgaria
1950s historical comedy films
German historical comedy films
1958 films
Bavaria Film films
Films shot at Bavaria Studios
German historical romance films
1950s historical romance films
1950s German films
1950s German-language films